Ziad Al-Khatib (Arabic:زياد الخطيب) (born 28 March 1990) is a Qatari footballer of Palestinian origins. He currently plays as a right back.

External links

References

Qatari footballers
1990 births
Living people
Al-Arabi SC (Qatar) players
Al-Khor SC players
Al-Wakrah SC players
El Jaish SC players
Umm Salal SC players
Muaither SC players
Lusail SC players
Qatar Stars League players
Qatari Second Division players
Association football fullbacks